is a passenger railway station  located in the city of Tottori, Tottori Prefecture, Japan. It is operated by the West Japan Railway Company (JR West).

Lines

Station layout
The station consists of two ground-level opposed side platforms connected by a footbridge to the station building.  The station is unattended.

Platforms

Adjacent stations
West Japan Railway Company (JR West)

History
Koyama Station opened on April 28, 1907.  With the privatization of the Japan National Railways (JNR) on April 1, 1987, the station came under the aegis of the West Japan Railway Company.

Passenger statistics
In fiscal 2020, the station was used by an average of 551 passengers daily.

See also
List of railway stations in Japan

References

External links 

 Koyama Station from JR-Odekake.net 

Railway stations in Tottori Prefecture
Stations of West Japan Railway Company
Sanin Main Line
Railway stations in Japan opened in 1907
Tottori (city)